Orders Gruiformes and Ciconiiformes established.
Adolphe Delattre and Johann Friedrich Naumann die in this year.
Italian bird collector Matteo Botteri travels to Mexico.
Réunion ibis described by Edmond de Sélys Longchamps.Other birds described in 1854 include fire-capped tit, thick-billed spiderhunter, cinnamon woodpecker, brown-breasted barbet, black-streaked puffbird, Hornby's storm petrel.
Edgar Leopold Layard travels to Cape Colony.
Jean-Baptiste Bailly publishes Ornithologie de la Savoie.
Ongoing events
John Gould The birds of Australia; Supplement 1851–69. 1 vol. 81 plates; Artists: J. Gould and H. C. Richter; Lithographer: H. C. Richter
John Gould The birds of Asia; 1850-83 7 vols. 530 plates, Artists: J. Gould, H. C. Richter, W. Hart and J. Wolf; Lithographers:H. C. Richter and W. Hart

References

Bird
Birding and ornithology by year